Doriot–Rider Log House is a log house at Tigard in Washington County, Oregon. It was listed on the National Register of Historic Places in June 2008.

History
In 1925, the log house was built for the guests by Harry Garfield and Delpha Doriot on their 20-acre property on Bull Mountain. Later in the year 1947, the Riders sold the property to Charles and Alberta Ryder.

It is architecturally significant as a vernacular log house reflecting a period when simple and rustic architecture in post-industrial world was popular.

References

National Register of Historic Places in Washington County, Oregon

Houses in Washington County, Oregon

Houses on the National Register of Historic Places in Oregon
1925 establishments in Oregon
Houses completed in 1925